USS LST-475 was a United States Navy  used in the Asiatic-Pacific Theater during World War II. As with many of her class, the ship was never named. Instead, she was referred to by her hull designation.

Construction
The ship was laid down on 14 November 1942, under Maritime Commission (MARCOM) contract, MC hull 995, by  Kaiser Shipyards, Vancouver, Washington; launched 16 November 1942; and commissioned on 20 March 1943.

Service history  
During the war, LST-475 was assigned to the Pacific Theater of Operations. She took part in the Eastern New Guinea operations, the Lae occupation in September 1943, and the Saidor occupation in January 1944; the Bismarck Archipelago operations, the Cape Gloucester, New Britain landings in December 1943; Hollandia operation in April 1944; the Western New Guinea operations, the Noemfoor Island operation in July 1944, the Cape Sansapor operation in July and August 1944, and the Morotai landing in September 1944; the Leyte operation in October and November 1944; the Lingayen Gulf landings in January 1945; and the Borneo operation, the Balikpapan operation in June and July 1945.

Following the war, LST-475 performed occupation duty in the Far East until mid-October 1945. Upon her return to the United States, the ship was decommissioned on 24 April 1946, and struck from the Navy list on 5 June, that same year. On 31 October 1946, she was sold to the Suwannee Fruit & Steamship Co., Jacksonville, Florida.

Honors and awards
LST-475 earned six battle stars for her World War II service.

Notes 

Citations

Bibliography 

Online resources

External links

 

LST-1-class tank landing ships of the United States Navy
1942 ships
World War II amphibious warfare vessels of the United States
S3-M2-K2 ships
Ships built in Vancouver, Washington